The Baiwang Bridge is a historic stone arch bridge over a stream in Yuecheng District of Shaoxing, Zhejiang, China.

History
The original bridge dates back to the Tang dynasty (618–907), but because of war and natural disasters has been rebuilt numerous times since then. The present version was completed in 1689, during the reign of Kangxi Emperor of the Qing dynasty (1644–1911). 

On 6 May 2013, it was listed among the seventh batch of "Major National Historical and Cultural Sites in Zhejiang" by the State Council of China.

Gallery

References

Bridges in Zhejiang
Arch bridges in China
Bridges completed in 1689
Qing dynasty architecture
Buildings and structures completed in 1689
1689 establishments in China
Major National Historical and Cultural Sites in Zhejiang